= Kyparodes =

Town of ancient Thrace

Coordinates: 41°06′16″N 29°03′15″E

Kyparodes was a town of ancient Thrace, inhabited during Roman times.

Its site is located near Karaköy in European Turkey.
